Ibsen Studies is a peer-reviewed academic journal covering research on the playwright Henrik Ibsen. It is published biannually by the Centre for Ibsen Studies at  the University of Oslo. It was originally published annually under the title Ibsenårbok by Universitetsforlaget from 1952 to 1988. From 1988 to 2000, it was published by Universitetsforlaget as Contemporary approaches to Ibsen.
Since 2000, it has been published under the title Ibsen Studies by Taylor & Francis (Routledge) on behalf of the Centre for Ibsen Studies.

The journal includes reviews of current Ibsen-related literature and a section on Ibsen-related events. It includes contributions from historians as well as literary and theatre scholars. The journal is classified as a level 2 journal, meaning the journal is considered leading in the field of literature studies, in the Norwegian Scientific Index, published by the Ministry of Education and Research.

References

External links 
 Ibsen Studies website
 

Studies
Arts journals
University of Oslo
Biannual journals
Publications established in 1952
1952 establishments in Norway
Routledge academic journals